Verdigris Creek Bridge in Antelope County, Nebraska near Royal, Nebraska was built in about 1918.  It was listed on the National Register of Historic Places in 1992.  It is also denoted NEHBS No. AP00-253.

It is a Kingpost pony truss bridge which probably was built by the Western Bridge & Construction Co. It was well  preserved when listed on the National Register and was then the last of just two surviving kingpost truss bridges in the state.

The other one, also in Antelope County, designated NEHBS No. APOO-252 and also NRHP-listed, seems no longer to exist.

References

External links

Bridges on the National Register of Historic Places in Nebraska
Bridges completed in 1918
Bridges in Antelope County, Nebraska
1918 establishments in Nebraska
National Register of Historic Places in Antelope County, Nebraska